Charles Turner Thackrah, MRCS Eng; (1795, in Leeds – 1833) was an English surgeon. He was a pioneer in the field of occupational medicine and is known for his work The Effects of the Principal Arts, Trades, and Professions, and of Civic States and Habits of Living, on Health and Longevity. He was a founder member of the Leeds School of Medicine. He died of tuberculosis in 1833, at the age of 38.

A building was opened in his honor and given his name at the University of Leeds in around 2007.

He is not to be confused with Charles Thackray who gave his name to the  Thackray Museum of Medicine in Leeds.

References

1795 births
1833 deaths
People from Leeds
19th-century deaths from tuberculosis
English surgeons
Medical doctors from Yorkshire
Tuberculosis deaths in England